The women's 400 metres at the 2005 World Championships in Athletics was held on August 7, 8 and 10 at the Helsinki Olympic Stadium.

Medals

Results
All times shown are in seconds.

Heats
August 7, 2005

Heat 1
 Ana Guevara 51.14 Q
 Christine Amertil 51.35 Q
 Fatou Bintou Fall 51.45 Q
 Donna Fraser 51.68 q
 Anna Guzowska 52.20 q
 Dímitra Dóva 52.29
 Egle Uljas 52.94 (SB)
 Kou Luogon 54.85

Heat 2
 DeeDee Trotter 51.44 Q
 Christine Ohuruogu 51.76 Q
 Karen Shinkins 51.82 Q
 Kaltouma Nadjina 51.88 q
 Lucimar Teodoro 52.19 q
 Asami Tanno 52.80
 Sandrine Thiébaud-Kangni 53.39
 Gayane Bulghadaryan 59.46

Heat 3
 Svetlana Pospelova 50.80 Q
 Tiandra Ponteen 51.37 Q
 Nawal El Jack 51.61 Q
 Maria Laura Almirão 52.69
 Libania Grenot 53.05
 Barbara Petráhn 53.09
 Kirsi Mykkänen 53.10
 Shifana Ali 1:01.55 (SB)

Heat 4
 Tonique Williams-Darling 51.04 Q
 Olesya Zykina 51.59 Q
 Shericka Williams 52.07 Q
 Anna Kozak 52.19 q
 Grażyna Prokopek 52.39
 Solen Désert-Mariller 52.94
 Amantle Montsho 53.97

Heat 5
 Sanya Richards 51.00 Q
 Amy Mbacké Thiam 51.66 Q
 Lorraine Fenton 52.07 Q
 Hazel-Ann Regis 52.51
 Antonina Yefremova 52.89
 Aliann Pompey 53.12
 Estie Wittstock 53.28

Heat 6
 Natalya Antyukh 51.38 Q
 Monique Henderson 51.65 Q
 Ilona Usovich 51.66 Q
 Lee McConnell 52.00 q
 Ronetta Smith 52.26
 Kineke Alexander 54.45
 Mounira Al-Saleh 55.83
 Hortense Bewouda DNF

Semifinal
August 8, 2005

Heat 1
 Sanya Richards 50.05 Q
 Amy Mbacké Thiam 50.83 Q (SB)
 Natalya Antyukh 50.99
 Nawal El Jack 51.85
 Tiandra Ponteen 51.88
 Shericka Williams 52.44
 Donna Fraser 52.48
 Anna Kozak 52.73

Heat 2
 Svetlana Pospelova 50.34 Q
 DeeDee Trotter 50.73 Q
 Christine Amertil 51.03
 Christine Ohuruogu 51.43
 Lorraine Fenton 51.48
 Kaltouma Nadjina 52.07
 Fatou Bintou Fall 52.35
 Anna Guzowska 52.45

Heat 3
 Tonique Williams-Darling 49.69 Q (SB)
 Ana Guevara 50.33 Q
 Olesya Zykina 50.73 q (SB)
 Monique Henderson 50.73 q
 Ilona Usovich 50.96 (PB)
 Lee McConnell 51.15 (SB)
 Lucimar Teodoro 51.98
 Karen Shinkins 52.17

Final
August 10, 2005

 Tonique Williams-Darling 49.55 (SB)
 Sanya Richards 49.74
 Ana Guevara 49.81 (SB)
 Svetlana Pospelova 50.11
 DeeDee Trotter 51.14
 Olesya Zykina 51.24
 Monique Henderson 51.77
 Amy Mbacké Thiam 52.22

External links
 – IAAF.org

400 metres
400 metres at the World Athletics Championships
2005 in women's athletics